The 2000 Pepsi 400 presented by Meijer was the 22nd stock car race of the 2000 NASCAR Winston Cup Series and the 31st iteration of the event. The race was held on Sunday, August 20, 2000, in Brooklyn, Michigan, at Michigan International Speedway, a two-mile (3.2 km) moderate-banked D-shaped speedway. The race took the scheduled 200 laps to complete. At race's end, Penske-Kranefuss Racing driver Rusty Wallace, with the help of his crew chief, would pull away on the final restart with 18 to go to win his 52nd career NASCAR Winston Cup Series win and his third of the season. To fill out the podium, Ricky Rudd of Robert Yates Racing and Bobby Labonte of Joe Gibbs Racing would finish second and third, respectively.

Background 

The race was held at Michigan International Speedway, a two-mile (3.2 km) moderate-banked D-shaped speedway located in Brooklyn, Michigan. The track is used primarily for NASCAR events. It is known as a "sister track" to Texas World Speedway as MIS's oval design was a direct basis of TWS, with moderate modifications to the banking in the corners, and was used as the basis of Auto Club Speedway. The track is owned by International Speedway Corporation. Michigan International Speedway is recognized as one of motorsports' premier facilities because of its wide racing surface and high banking (by open-wheel standards; the 18-degree banking is modest by stock car standards).

Entry list 

 (R) denotes rookie driver.

Practice

First practice 
The first practice session was held on Friday, August 18, at 1:35 PM EST. The session would last for 55 minutes.

Second practice 
The second practice session was held on Saturday, August 19, at 9:00 AM EST. The session would last for one hour.

Third and final practice 
The third and final practice session, sometimes referred to as Happy Hour, was held on Saturday, August 19, after the preliminary 2000 NAPAonline.com 250.

Qualifying 
Qualifying was split into two rounds. The first round was held on Friday, August 18, at 3:30 PM EST. Each driver would have two laps to set a fastest time; the fastest of the two would count as their official qualifying lap. During the first round, the top 25 drivers in the round would be guaranteed a starting spot in the race. If a driver was not able to guarantee a spot in the first round, they had the option to scrub their time from the first round and try and run a faster lap time in a second round qualifying run, held on Saturday, August 19, at 10:45 AM EST. As with the first round, each driver would have two laps to set a fastest time; the fastest of the two would count as their official qualifying lap. Positions 26-36 would be decided on time, while positions 37-43 would be based on provisionals. Six spots are awarded by the use of provisionals based on owner's points. The seventh is awarded to a past champion who has not otherwise qualified for the race. If no past champion needs the provisional, the next team in the owner points will be awarded a provisional.

Six drivers would fail to qualify: Geoff Bodine, Darrell Waltrip, Stacy Compton, Kyle Petty, David Keith, and Carl Long.

Full qualifying results

Race results

References 

2000 NASCAR Winston Cup Series
NASCAR races at Michigan International Speedway
August 2000 sports events in the United States
2000 in sports in Michigan